Hwang Jung-gon (born 16 May 1992) is a South Korean professional golfer.

Hwang plays on the Japan Golf Tour and won his first title at the 2011 Gateway to The Open Mizuno Open. This win earned him entry into the 2011 Open Championship where he finished 71st.

Hwang ended his 2019 season with a T8 at the Golf Nippon Series JT Cup, his last event before starting mandatory military service.

Professional wins (7)

Japan Golf Tour wins (4)

Japan Golf Tour playoff record (0–2)

Korean Tour wins (3)

Playoff record
Asian Tour playoff record (0–1)

Results in major championships

CUT = missed the halfway cut
Note: Hwang never played in the Masters Tournament or the PGA Championship.

Results in World Golf Championships

"T" = Tied

References

External links

South Korean male golfers
Japan Golf Tour golfers
1992 births
Living people